The 2009 4 Nations Cup was the 14th playing of the annual women's ice hockey tournament. It was held in cities around Finland, from November 3–7, 2009.

Results

Preliminary round

Bronze medal game

Gold medal game

External links
Tournament on hockeyarchives.info

2009-10
2009–10 in Finnish ice hockey
2009–10 in Swedish ice hockey
2009–10 in Canadian women's ice hockey
2009–10 in American women's ice hockey
2009-10
2009–10 in women's ice hockey
November 2009 sports events in Europe